Johnny Ward (born 21 May 1987) is an Irish actor from Walkinstown, Dublin. He is best known for his role as Pauley in the fifth series of the RTÉ drama series Love/Hate, for playing the part of controversial kidnapper, Ciaran Holloway in Fair City, and starring alongside Sean Penn in the 2011 comedy-drama This Must Be the Place.

Career
In 2014, Johnny starred in his breakthrough role of Pauley in the Irish drama, Love/Hate.

He has played six different roles in Fair City.

In December 2018, Ward was named as one of the eleven celebrities taking part in the third series of Dancing with the Stars. Ward was partnered with British dancer, Emily Barker. They reached the final of the competition, eventually finishing as runners-up to Mairéad Ronan and John Nolan.

Personal life
Ward was born and raised in Walkinstown, a suburb in South Dublin. He attended Templeogue College. His sister Maureen is a talent agent; together they run a performing arts school.

While taking part in Dancing with the Stars, Ward's father, John, died after a long battle with cancer the day before Ward was due to perform in the ninth live show. Ward was given the option to have a week off from the competition and return in Week 10 but he chose to perform in honour of his father.

Filmography

Film

Television

Stage

References

External links

Male actors from Dublin (city)
Irish male television actors
1987 births
Living people